Chiretolpis unicolor is a moth of the family Erebidae. It is found on Ambon Island.

References

Nudariina
Moths described in 1901
Moths of Indonesia